Red Bull Bragantino II is a professional association football club based in Bragança Paulista, São Paulo, Brazil. The team currently plays in the Campeonato Paulista Série A3, the third tier of the São Paulo state football league. As it is also Red Bull Bragantino's reserve team, it plays in the Campeonato Brasileiro de Aspirantes under the Red Bull Bragantino name. 

Founded on 19 November 2007, the club is owned by Red Bull GmbH. Due to the failure of the plan to reach the Série A, Red Bull made a partnership with Clube Atlético Bragantino. However, Red Bull Brasil remains active, functioning as a development team for the Bragança Paulista side.

History
In 2009 the team won the Campeonato Paulista Segunda Divisão, the fourth tier of the São Paulo state professional football championship in its second season. In 2010 the team gained their next promotion after winning the Campeonato Paulista Série A3 2010 season. In 2010 the team reached the final of the Copa Paulista, the São Paulo state cup tournament in its first year of eligibility in that competition.

The 2011 season turned out unsuccessful for Red Bull Brasil. They ended the league's first phase with an 8-4-6 win-draw-loss record, resulting in a fifth place finish and thus failing to move to phase 2 by 4 points. 2012 was much more successful for the club. They finished in 3rd in the regular season in Campeonato Paulista Série A2 but were then knocked out in the semi final stage, finishing 3rd in their group.

The team was the 2014 Campeonato Paulista Série A2 runner-up and was promoted to the Campeonato Paulista Série A1. In 2015, the team reached the quarter-finals, where they lost to São Paulo. With a 6th place finish, the team qualified to the Campeonato Brasileiro Série D, where they did not advance to playoffs.

In 2016, the team again reached quarter-finals of the Campeonato Paulista Série A1, then lost to Corinthians. The team qualified to the Copa do Brasil, losing in first round to América Mineiro.

On 26 March 2019, Bragantino's president announced a partnership deal with Red Bull Brasil.

On 16 January 2023, Red Bull Brasil changed its name to Red Bull Bragantino II, like a team B of Red Bull Bragantino.

Squad

Head coaches
 Paulo Sérgio (2008)
 Ricardo Pinto (2008–2009)
 José Luis Fernandes (2009)
 Jair Picerni (2009)
 Márcio Fernandes (2010–2011)
 Luciano Dias (2011–12)
 Argel Fucks (2012–13)
 Mauricio Barbieri (2014–2016)
 Alberto Valentim (2017)
 Silas Pereira (2017)
 Ricardo Catalá (2017–2018)
 Antônio Carlos Zago (2018–2019)
 Vinicius Munhoz (2020–)

Season results
2008: Campeonato Paulista Segunda Divisão (Tier IV - State Level)
reached 3rd Phase (5th to 8th place)
2009: Campeonato Paulista Segunda Divisão (Tier IV - State Level)
Champion
2010: Campeonato Paulista Série A3 (Tier III - State Level)
Champion
2011: Campeonato Paulista Série A2 (Tier II - State Level)
eliminated 1st Phase
2012: Campeonato Paulista Série A2 (Tier II - State Level)
eliminated 2nd Phase (5th to 8th place)
2013: Campeonato Paulista Série A2 (Tier II - State Level)
eliminated 2nd Phase (5th to 8th place)
2014: Campeonato Paulista Série A2 (Tier II - State Level)
runner-up. Promoted to Campeonato Paulista
2015:
Campeonato Paulista (Tier I - State Level)
eliminated Quarter-finals (6th place)
Campeonato Brasileiro Série D (Tier IV - National Level)
eliminated 1st Phase (4th in Group A7 - 26th overall)
2016:
Campeonato Paulista (Tier I - State Level)
eliminated Quarter-finals (7th place)
Copa do Brasil
eliminated in 1st Round
2017:
Campeonato Paulista (Tier I - State Level)
eliminated in 1st Phase (13th Place)
Campeonato Brasileiro Série D (Tier IV - National Level)
eliminated in Group stage (3rd in Group A14 - 44th overall)
2018:
Campeonato Paulista (Tier I - State Level)
eliminated in 1st Phase (12th Place)
2019:
Campeonato Paulista (Tier I - State Level)
eliminated in Quarter-finals (5th Place)

Honours
Campeonato Paulista Série A3: 2010
Campeonato Paulista Série B: 2009
Campeonato Paulista do Interior: 2019

See also
 RB Leipzig
 New York Red Bulls
 FC Red Bull Salzburg
 Red Bull Ghana
 Red Bull Bragantino

References

External links
Official site 
Official site 
Red Bull Brasil SP 
Article about Red Bull Brasil at Brazilian sports newspaper Lance 
Red Bull Football 

 
Association football clubs established in 2007
Sport in Campinas
Football clubs in São Paulo (state)
Red Bull sports teams
2007 establishments in Brazil